Vilmos Iváncsó (23 February 1939 – 25 November 1997) was a Hungarian volleyball player. He competed in the men's tournament at the 1964 Summer Olympics.

References

External links
 

1939 births
1997 deaths
Hungarian men's volleyball players
Olympic volleyball players of Hungary
Volleyball players at the 1964 Summer Olympics
People from Khust
Sportspeople from Zakarpattia Oblast